Strzelecki Track is a mostly unsealed outback track in South Australia, linking Innamincka to  Lyndhurst.

History 
In 1870, the  track was pioneered by stockman, drover and cattle thief Harry Readford. He stole 1,000 head of cattle from a remote cattle station in Queensland. He drove them down the track, and sold them at Blanchewater Station. He then fled to Adelaide. Pastoralists then used the track as a stock route in the late 19th and early 20th centuries.  

After gas was discovered by Santos in the 1960s, it started carrying more traffic as a route to Moomba. Some sections were sealed.

Description 
The track  links  Innamincka to  Lyndhurst through the Strzelecki Desert. It is mostly unsealed, but with a few short sealed sections to facilitate overtaking.  It is passable to conventional vehicles during the dry season, although caution is required. 

The track is prone to flooding after heavy rains. At other times the surface can be corrugated, with loose stones and dust.

The Strzelecki Track is linked with the Birdsville Track via the Walkers Crossing Track. It is closed in summer and only traversable in dry weather.

A shorter route is available via a public access road between Moomba and Innamincka, making the distance .

Heritage listings

A number of isolated heritage-listed sites are located nearby to the Strzelecki Track:

 Tinga Tingana Homestead Ruins
 Gray's Tree
 Well and Whim, Coochilara Waterhole, Merty Merty Station
 Old Mulga Bore, Merty Merty Station

See also

 Highways in Australia
 List of highways in South Australia
 Stock route

References

External links

Further reading
 Lewis, Craig and Savage, Cathy (2005) Australia's top 4WD getaways Prahran, Vic. Explore Australia Publishing. 
 Flinders Range Research – Historical information about South Australia and the Northern Territory

Australian outback tracks
Roads in South Australia
Far North (South Australia)